V. S. Francis  is the fourth Bishop of East Kerela: he has served since 2019.

Francis  was born in Ellumpuram on 18 May 1961. He was educated at the Union Biblical Seminary, Pune. He served congregations in Chemmannar, Kattappana, Konnathadi and Kaliyar. He was also Chaplain to Bishop George Daniel and 
Treasurer of the East Kerala Diocese of the Church of South India. He was consecrated of him  at the CSI Cathedral Melukavu on 8 July 2019

Notes

 

 

21st-century Anglican bishops in India
Indian bishops
Indian Christian religious leaders
Anglican bishops of East Kerala
1961 births
Living people
Union Biblical Seminary, Pune alumni